Threonine (symbol Thr or T) is an amino acid that is used in the biosynthesis of proteins. It contains an α-amino group (which is in the protonated −NH form under biological conditions), a carboxyl group (which is in the deprotonated −COO− form under biological conditions), and a side chain containing a hydroxyl group, making it a polar, uncharged amino acid. It is essential in humans, meaning the body cannot synthesize it: it must be obtained from the diet. Threonine is synthesized from aspartate in bacteria such as E. coli. It is encoded by all the codons starting AC (ACU, ACC, ACA, and ACG).

Threonine sidechains are often hydrogen bonded; the most common small motifs formed are based on interactions with serine: ST turns, ST motifs (often at the beginning of alpha helices) and ST staples (usually at the middle of alpha helices).

Modifications

The threonine residue is susceptible to numerous posttranslational modifications. The hydroxyl side-chain can undergo O-linked glycosylation. In addition, threonine residues undergo phosphorylation through the action of a threonine kinase. In its phosphorylated form, it can be referred to as phosphothreonine. Phosphothreonine has three potential coordination sites (carboxyl, amine and phosphate group) and determination of the mode of coordination between phosphorylated ligands and metal ions occurring in an organism is important to explain the function of the phosphothreonine in biological processes.

History
Threonine was the last of the 20 common proteinogenic amino acids to be discovered. It was discovered in 1936 by William Cumming Rose, collaborating with Curtis Meyer. The amino acid was named threonine because it was similar in structure to threonic acid, a four-carbon monosaccharide with molecular formula C4H8O5

Stereoisomers

Threonine is one of two proteinogenic amino acids with two stereogenic centers, the other being isoleucine. Threonine can exist in four possible stereoisomers with the following configurations: (2S,3R), (2R,3S), (2S,3S) and (2R,3R). However, the name L-threonine is used for one single stereoisomer, (2S,3R)-2-amino-3-hydroxybutanoic acid. The second stereoisomer (2S,3S), which is rarely present in nature, is called L-allothreonine. The two stereoisomers (2R,3S)- and (2R,3R)-2-amino-3-hydroxybutanoic acid are only of minor importance.

Biosynthesis
As an essential amino acid, threonine is not synthesized in humans, and needs to be present in proteins in the diet. Adult humans require about 20 mg/kg body weight/day. In plants and microorganisms, threonine is synthesized from aspartic acid via α-aspartyl-semialdehyde and homoserine. Homoserine undergoes O-phosphorylation; this phosphate ester undergoes hydrolysis concomitant with relocation of the OH group.  Enzymes involved in a typical biosynthesis of threonine include:
 aspartokinase
 β-aspartate semialdehyde dehydrogenase
 homoserine dehydrogenase
 homoserine kinase
 threonine synthase.

Metabolism
Threonine is metabolized in at least three ways:
 In many animals it is converted to pyruvate via threonine dehydrogenase.  An intermediate in this pathway can undergo thiolysis with CoA to produce acetyl-CoA and glycine.
 In humans the gene for threonine dehydrogenase is an inactive pseudogene, so threonine is converted to α-ketobutyrate. The mechanism of the first step is analogous to that catalyzed by serine dehydratase, and the serine and threonine dehydratase reactions are probably catalyzed by the same enzyme.
 In many organisms it is O-phosphorylated by a kinase preparatory to further metabolism. This is especially important in bacteria as part of the biosynthesis of cobalamin (Vitamin B12), as the product is converted to (R)-1-aminopropan-2-ol for incorporation into the vitamin's sidechain.
Threonine is used to synthesize glycine during the endogenous production of L-carnitine in the brain and liver of rats.

Sources
Foods high in threonine include cottage cheese, poultry, fish, meat, lentils, black turtle bean and sesame seeds.

Racemic threonine can be prepared from crotonic acid by alpha-functionalization using mercury(II) acetate.

References

External links
Threonine biosynthesis
CID 205
CID 6288

Proteinogenic amino acids
Glucogenic amino acids
Ketogenic amino acids
Essential amino acids
Glycine receptor agonists